Gravel Hill Plantation is a historic hunting plantation complex located at Garnett, Hampton County, South Carolina. It was built in 1910, and is the 20-acre core of a large hunting plantation that includes eleven historic buildings; nine of them were designed and built by the owner, Robert Palmer Huntington. The complex includes three residential buildings, a kitchen and dining facility, ice house, stables and ancillary service buildings. Also on the property are a corn crib and a tenant's house.  It is a rare example of the Adirondack or Rustic Style in South Carolina.

It was listed on the National Register of Historic Places in 2010.

References 

Houses on the National Register of Historic Places in South Carolina
Houses completed in 1910
National Register of Historic Places in Hampton County, South Carolina
Houses in Hampton County, South Carolina